Mohammad Khairul Anwar bin Abdul Rahim (born 16 September 1992) is a Bruneian footballer who plays as a midfielder for Kasuka FC. He previously played for Bruneian powerhouses Indera SC and DPMM FC. 

Khairul trained with the youth system of Indera SC and made his league debut in 2011. He won the first two Brunei Super League championships in 2012–13 and 2014. The following season, he was one of four local recruits selected to play for Brunei's professional club DPMM FC, along with Indera teammate Reduan Petara, Yura Indera Putera Yunos and Aminuddin Zakwan Tahir. He failed to make an appearance in DPMM's title-winning season of 2015.

Khairul found form at the start of 2016 and was a second-half substitute in the season-opening Community Shield on 13 February which DPMM lost 3–2. However, by March he failed to remain in Steve Kean's plans after two further substitute appearances.

He was released in February 2018, ending a three-year spell with only five league appearances to his name.

Honours

Team
Indera SC
Brunei Super League: 2012–13, 2014
DPMM FC
 S.League: 2015

References

External links 

1992 births
Living people
Association football midfielders
Bruneian footballers
DPMM FC players
Indera SC players